Kami may refer to:
 Kami, Hyōgo (Mikata)
 Kami, Hyōgo (Taka)